A Royal Naval Hospital was a hospital operated by the British Royal Navy.

Royal Naval Hospital may also refer to:

London
 Royal Naval Hospital, Greenwich, London
 Royal Naval Hospital, Portland, Dorset
 Royal Naval Hospital, Stonehouse, Plymouth
 Royal Naval Hospital Haslar, Gosport, Hampshire

Elsewhere
 Royal Naval Hospital, Herne Bay, Sydney, Australia
 Royal Naval Hospital (Hong Kong)
 Royal Naval Hospital Gibraltar

See also
 Naval Hospital (disambiguation)